Anti-Justine is a French pornographic novel by Nicolas Restif de la Bretonne (1734-1806) published in 1798.  It was written to oppose the political philosophy of the Marquis de Sade as expressed in Justine.

Texts
  - French only.

References
 
 
 
 

1798 novels
18th-century French novels
French erotic novels
Pornographic novels
French pornography